Winds Devouring Men is the fifth album by neoclassical band Elend. It is the first album in the Winds Cycle trilogy. The special edition was released in a digipak with a bonus track called "Silent Slumber: A God That Breeds Pestilence".

This album is notable as a progression from earlier Elend work in that it does not rely on synthesizers and sequencing to achieve an orchestral sound — though there are still computerized effects, the majority of the music is played on acoustic instruments by chamber musicians.

Track listing
"The Poisonous Eye" — 6:55
"Worn Out With Dreams" — 5:43
"Charis" — 5:58
"Under War-Broken Trees" — 5:36
"Away from Barren Stars" — 7:28
"Winds Devouring Men" — 4:38
"Vision Is All That Matters" — 5:59
"The Newborn Sailor" — 5:45
"The Plain Masks of Daylight" — 5:54
"A Staggering Moon" — 6:10
"Silent Slumber: A God that Breeds Pestilence" — 5:18*

* Bonus track on special edition.

Musicians
Klaus Amann: trumpet, horn, trombone
Nathalie Barbary: soprano
Shinji Chihara: violin, viola
David Kempf: violin, solo violin
Esteri Rémond: soprano
All other instruments and vocals, sound-design and programming by Iskandar Hasnawi, Sébastien Roland and Renaud Tschirner.
Industrial landscapes and noises captured by Simon Eberl and Renaud Tschirner, designed and programmed by Iskandar Hasnawi.

References

2003 albums
Elend (band) albums